Kason Ronald Gabbard (born April 8, 1982) is a former American  professional baseball pitcher. He played in Major League Baseball (MLB) for the Boston Red Sox and the Texas Rangers.

High school
Gabbard played high school baseball at Royal Palm Beach High School in Royal Palm Beach, Florida. His teammates included his former Rangers teammate, catcher Jarrod Saltalamacchia.

Professional career

2006
A 29th-round draft pick by the Boston Red Sox in 2000, Gabbard started the  season with Boston's Double-A affiliate Portland and posted a 9-2 record with a 2.57 ERA in 13 starts. Promoted to Triple-A Pawtucket on June 23, he went 1-3 with a 4.97 ERA in five starts. He earned a promotion to the Boston Red Sox on July 21 to replace Tim Wakefield, who was placed on the disabled list. In his major league debut on July 22, he allowed two earned runs in 5 innings to the Seattle Mariners and was charged with a loss. Gabbard's first major league win was on September 5 against the Chicago White Sox. Gabbard pitched seven shutout innings, surrendering three hits and striking out six in a 1-0 Red Sox win.

Gabbard became the ninth rookie to pitch for the Red Sox in the 2006 season, joining Abe Alvarez, Craig Breslow, Manny Delcarmen, Craig Hansen, Jon Lester, Jonathan Papelbon, David Pauley, and Jermaine Van Buren. He also became the third Triple-A recall to move into Boston's rotation in six weeks, joining Kyle Snyder and Lester. They replaced David Wells and Matt Clement, who had gone on the disabled list. Likewise, Gabbard joined Pauley as one of two Boston starters to have begun the 2006 season in Double-A Portland.

2007
Gabbard was called up from Triple-A Pawtucket to pitch on May 20, against Atlanta in place of Josh Beckett. He had a good performance allowing 2 runs on 6 hits over 5 innings and got the win. He was then immediately optioned back to Pawtucket after the game. Gabbard started on June 26, 2007, against Seattle in place of Curt Schilling, who was placed on the disabled list. Gabbard had a sub-par performance, earning a no decision, and lasted only 3 innings allowing 4 runs on 6 hits while walking six and striking out two. Gabbard performed well in his third start of the season on July 2, 2007, allowing three runs on three hits while walking four and striking out five, earning the win.

He tossed his first complete game shutout on July 16, 2007, against the Royals in a 4-0 victory, allowing only 3 hits, 1 walk, and striking out 8.

Gabbard was traded to the Texas Rangers on July 31, 2007, for relief pitcher Éric Gagné, the same day Atlanta traded his high school teammate Saltalamacchia to Texas. The Red Sox would go on to win the World Series, and Gabbard was awarded a World Series ring by the team.

Gabbard made his Rangers debut on August 2, 2007, against Cleveland and took the loss, as the Indians won the game 5-0. Less than three weeks later, on August 22, Gabbard was the winning pitcher in a game when the Rangers outscored the Orioles 30-3, the most runs scored in a game in the modern era.

2008
On May 8, in a game against the Seattle Mariners, Gabbard threw a head high pitch across the middle of the plate causing Richie Sexson to threw his batting helmet at Gabbard and then Sexson came charging the mound at Gabbard. Sexson reacted as if the pitch had hit him. Sexson later stated he was frustrated and had a lot going on in his head, including his club's recent struggles. Sexson was suspended six games for the incident; a successful appeal lowered the suspension to five games.

2009
After the Rangers' 2009 spring training camp, Gabbard was sent outright to the Triple-A Oklahoma City RedHawks.

On April 22, Darren O'Day made his Rangers debut, but was so new his jersey had yet to arrive, so was forced to borrow Gabbard's jersey.

On April 23, the Red Sox re-acquired Gabbard from the Rangers for cash considerations. They assigned him to the Pawtucket Red Sox.

As of July 27, Gabbard went on a rehab assignment in the Red Sox farm system, pitching for the single-A affiliate Lowell Spinners.

As of July 24, 2010, the Boston Red Sox released Gabbard, making him a free agent. He retired in 2012.

Pitching style
Gabbard had the standard repertoire of fastball, curveball, and changeup, occasionally throwing a slider.  Gabbard's fastball hit the high-80s, his changeup worked the best low and away on right-handed hitters, and his slow curveball was especially effective against lefties. Not a power strikeout pitcher, Gabbard was compared to Mark Buehrle and Kenny Rogers.

References

External links

Kayson Gabbard Minor League Splits and Situational Stats

1982 births
Living people
Boston Red Sox players
Texas Rangers players
Baseball players from Ohio
Major League Baseball pitchers
People from Oxford, Ohio
Gulf Coast Red Sox players
Augusta GreenJackets players
Indian River State Pioneers baseball players
Sarasota Red Sox players
Portland Sea Dogs players
Pawtucket Red Sox players
Frisco RoughRiders players
Oklahoma RedHawks players
Oklahoma City RedHawks players
Lowell Spinners players